Emmitt Mack Williams V (born September 15, 1998) is an American professional basketball player for the Ontario Clippers of the NBA G League. He has also played for Napoli Basket of the Italian Lega Basket Serie A (LBA). He played college basketball for the LSU Tigers.

High school career
As a freshman, Williams played for Lehigh Senior High School in Lehigh Acres, Florida, where he averaged 15.3 points and 11.2 rebounds per game before transferring to IMG Academy in Bradenton, Florida for his sophomore season. At IMG Academy, he was teammates with highly-touted recruits Trevon Duval and Silvio De Sousa and played for one of the best teams in the country. In the 2015–16 season, Williams averaged 16.4 points, 12.6 rebounds and 2.9 blocks per game, playing in the power forward position. 

For his senior season, Williams transferred to Oak Ridge High School in Orlando, Florida. On October 11, 2017, he was arrested on charges of felonious sexual battery and false imprisonment. Williams pleaded not guilty and was released on $13,500 bond six days later. He made his debut for Oak Ridge on December 1, after sitting out his first two games. On December 20, his charges were dismissed after the case was deemed "not suitable for prosecution." 

Williams averaged 17.6 points, 12.4 rebounds and 1.7 blocks per game, leading his team to the Florida High School Athletic Association (FHSAA) Class 9A state championship. On April 8, 2018, he recorded 44 points, seven rebounds and three steals at the Jordan Brand Classic and was named most valuable player (MVP) of the game. He broke the single-game scoring record for the event previously held by LeBron James. He also took part in the Ballislife All-American Game, of which he was named co-MVP with Moses Brown after he was the game's top scorer (31 points) and best rebounder (12).

Recruiting
Williams was a consensus five-star recruit and one of the most highly-rated power forwards in the 2018 recruiting class. On January 26, 2018, he committed to play college basketball for LSU over offers from Oregon and Florida, among others.

College career
As a freshman, Williams averaged 7.0 points and 5.4 rebounds per game, making eight starts on a team that reached the Sweet 16. He had a season-high 15 points twice. Williams scored 13 points and a career-best 14 rebounds in a 79–78 overtime win at Florida. Following the season, he declared for the 2018 NBA draft but decided to return. On November 24, 2019, Williams scored a career-high 27 points and collected nine rebounds in a 96–83 win against Rhode Island. On January 29, 2020, Williams had 23 points and 11 rebounds in a 90–76 win over Alabama. As a sophomore, Williams averaged 13.3 points, 6.6 rebounds, and 1.2 blocks per game. Following the season, he declared for the 2020 NBA draft.

Professional career

Agua Caliente Clippers / Hapoel Acre (2021–2022)
After going undrafted in the 2020 NBA draft, Williams was included in the roster of the Agua Caliente Clippers announced on February 4, 2021. He played 13 games and averaged 4.2 points, 4.2 rebounds and 0.3 assists in 12.3 minutes.

On April 1, 2021, Williams signed with Hapoel Acre, where he played 8 games and averaged 13.8 points, 9.9 rebounds, 1.6 assists and 1.3 blocks in 25.0 minutes.

After joining the Oklahoma City Thunder for the 2021 NBA Summer League, Williams was re-signed by Agua Caliente in October 27, 2021. In 23 games, he averaged 8.4 points, five rebounds and 0.8 assists per game on 51.6 and 45 per cent shooting from the field and three-point range, respectively.

Fraser Valley Bandits (2022)
On April 27, 2022, Williams signed with the Fraser Valley Bandits of the CEBL.

Napoli Basket (2022)
On August 30, 2022, he has signed with Napoli Basket of the Italian Lega Basket Serie A (LBA). He suffered a muscle injury in the calf of the right leg on September 27, 2022 and after not playing a single game, he was waived by the team on November 9, 2022.

Ontario Clippers (2022–present)
On December 21, 2022, Williams was reacquired by the Ontario Clippers.

Career statistics

College

|-
| style="text-align:left;"| 2018–19
| style="text-align:left;"| LSU
| 34 || 8 || 19.7 || .614 || .167 || .686 || 5.4 || .4 || .3 || .6 || 7.0
|-
| style="text-align:left;"| 2019–20
| style="text-align:left;"| LSU
| 31 || 25 || 28.0 || .560 || .421 || .769 || 6.6 || 1.2 || .8 || 1.2 || 13.3
|- class="sortbottom"
| style="text-align:center;" colspan="2"| Career
| 65 || 33 || 23.7 || .579 || .360 || .738 || 5.9 || .8 || .5 || .9 || 10.0

Personal life
Williams' best friend and high school teammate, Stef'an Strawder, was shot and killed in Fort Myers, Florida on July 25, 2016. Williams used Strawder's death as motivation to continue playing basketball. Currently, Williams is signed with NBA Agent, Michael Raymond of Raymond Representation and is Managed by Jonathan Moore at CK Talent Management.

References

External links
LSU Tigers bio
USA Basketball bio

1998 births
Living people
Agua Caliente Clippers players
American expatriate basketball people in Canada
American expatriate basketball people in Israel
American men's basketball players
Basketball players from Florida
Fraser Valley Bandits players
LSU Tigers basketball players
Power forwards (basketball)
Sportspeople from Fort Myers, Florida
Napoli Basket players